Bobanum Moliyum is a 1971 Indian Malayalam-language film, directed by J. Sasikumar. The film stars Madhu, Kaviyoor Ponnamma, Adoor Bhasi and Manavalan Joseph. It features the Malayalam cartoon characters, which were created by Toms: Boban and Molly.

Plot

Cast

 Madhu as Balan
 Kaviyoor Ponnamma as Santhamma
 Adoor Bhasi as Uppayi
 Manavalan Joseph as Pothan Vakkeel 
 Muthukulam Raghavan Pillai as Velu Pilla
 Sankaradi as Mammad
 Adoor Bhavani as Kuttiyamma
 Baby Rajani as Molly
 Bahadoor as Ittoop
 Kaduvakulam Antony as Pilla
 Master Sekhar as Boban
 Meena as Saramma
 Pankajavalli as Marykutty
 S. P. Pillai as Kittu Pilla 
 Vettoor Purushan as Pareed
 Vijayasree as Nalini 
 Pala Thankam
 P. R. Menon as Gopala Pilla

Soundtrack
The music was composed by Joseph Krishna and the lyrics were written by Vayalar Ramavarma.

References

External links
 

1970s Malayalam-language films
1971 films
Films based on Indian comics
Live-action films based on comics